Empire Broadsword was a Type C1-S-AY-1 infantry landing ship built in 1943 as Cape Marshall. She was renamed Empire Broadsword before completion and entering into service for the Ministry of War Transport (MoWT). She had a short career, entering service in December 1943 and being sunk by a mine in July 1944.

Construction
The ship was built by Consolidated Steel Corporation, Wilmington, California as yard number 348. She was launched on 16 August 1943 as Cape Marshall. She was propelled by two steam turbines which drove a single screw via double reduction gearing. The steam turbine were manufactured by Westinghouse Electrical and Manufacturing Corp, Essington, Pennsylvania.

Career
The ship was transferred under the terms of lend lease shortly after being completed in 1943 under the name Empire Broadsword. She was chartered by the MoWT, and was operated under the management of Cunard White Star Line

Empire Broadsword was mined and sunk off Normandy on July 2, 1944, while supporting the allied invasion of Europe. Those lost on Empire Broadsword are commemorated at the Tower Hill Memorial, London.

Official Numbers and Code Letters

Official Numbers were a forerunner to IMO Numbers. Empire Broadsword had the UK Official Number 169737 and used the Code Letters MYMJ.

References

Sources
 

 

Type C1-S ships
Ships built in Los Angeles
1943 ships
Empire ships
Ministry of War Transport ships
Steamships of the United Kingdom
Troop ships of the United Kingdom
World War II shipwrecks in the English Channel
Maritime incidents in July 1944
Ships sunk by mines